Praemonitus praemunitus or forewarned is forearmed may refer to:

 Motto of the United States Army Security Agency
 Motto of the U.S. Air Force Theater Battle Control Division at Hanscom Air Force Base, Massachusetts

 Praemonitus Praemunitus, the title of the second American edition of the Protocols of the Elders of Zion, first published in 1920
 Praemonitus Praemunitus, the motto of Investigations & Protective Services, Hollywood, Florida.
 Forewarned is Forearmed, the motto of the British Royal Observer Corps
 Praemonitus Praemunitus, the motto of the Gearing-class destroyer 
 Forewarned, Forearmed, the motto of the Australian Army Intelligence Corps. 

Latin words and phrases